Great Things may refer to:
 Great Things (album), a 2009 album by Ian McNabb, or the title song
 Great Things (Echobelly song), 1995
 Great Things (Phil Wickham song), 2018